Undhiyu is a Gujarati mixed vegetable dish that is a regional specialty of Surat, Gujarat, India. The name of this dish comes from the Gujarati word "undhu", which translates to upside down, since the dish is  traditionally cooked upside down underground in earthen pots, termed "matlu", which are fired from above.

The dish is a seasonal one, comprising the vegetables that are available on the South Gujarat coastline, including the Surat, Navsari and Valsad regions, during the winter, including (amongst others) green beans or new peas (typically used along with the tender pod), unripe banana, small eggplants, muthia (dumplings/fritters made with fenugreek leaves and spiced chickpea flour (besan) or handva no lot, and either steamed or fried), potatoes, and purple yam, and sometimes plantain.  These are spiced with a dry curry paste that typically includes cilantro leaves, ginger, garlic, green chili pepper, sugar and sometimes includes freshly grated coconut. The mixture is slow cooked for a long time, with some vegetable oil and a very small amount of water sufficient to steam the root vegetables.

The finished preparation is dry: individual chunks of vegetables are coated with a thin layer of spice and oil but retain their shape: the contents of the dish must therefore be stirred relatively infrequently during the cooking. Crisp vegetables such as bean pods must ideally retain a little of their crunchy texture. To ensure that no individual component is overcooked, the vegetables may need to be cooked in stages: the root vegetables and eggplant are half-cooked before adding the quick-cooking bean pods and ripe plantain. The finished dish is garnished with chopped cilantro leaf and lemon or lime juice before serving.

Surti undhiyu is a variant that is served with puri at weddings and banquets.  Again it is a mixed vegetable casserole, made with red lentils and seasoned with spices, grated coconut, and palm sugar in a mild sauce.  It is garnished with chopped peanuts and toasted grated coconut, and served with rice.

Undhiyu with puri and shrikhand is often eaten in Gujarati houses during the winter.

Related Dishes 
The theme of cooking the seasonal winter vegetables into a stew is common across the Indian subcontinent and around the world. Few common examples are, Avial from the Kerala cuisine is a spicy mix vegetable stew, Shukto from the Bengali cuisine while  Ghanta from the Odia Cuisine shares more similarities with Undhiyu as Odia Food culture too revolves around mild and sweet main courses just as their Gujarati counterpart. The French cuisine has its equivalent dish, the famous Ratatouille.

See also
 List of casserole dishes

References

Gujarati cuisine
Casserole dishes
Vegetable dishes
Indian vegetable dishes
Culture of Surat